Sir Albert William Liley  (12 March 1929 – 15 June 1983) was a New Zealand medical practitioner, renowned for developing techniques to improve the health of foetuses in utero.

Education and career
Liley graduated from Otago Medical School at the University of Otago in Dunedin, in 1954. After a period at Australian National University in Canberra, he returned to Auckland where he worked for the rest of his life except for a brief period at Columbia University. While in Auckland he held a number of posts, including at Auckland University, National Women's Hospital and the Medical Research Council of New Zealand (now the Health Research Council of New Zealand).

In 1963, after three unsuccessful attempts, Liley successfully carried out the first ever successful intrauterine blood transfusion. The fetus had Rh disease/hemolytic disease and had been expected to die before birth. The highly publicised procedure was a milestone in not only medical treatment but also public perception. Initially the procedure had a success rate of only about 40%, but this rose over time.

Liley was awarded fellowships with the American College of Obstetricians and Gynecologists and the Royal College of Obstetricians and Gynaecologists, and was appointed to the Vatican's Pontifical Academy of the Sciences, although he was an atheist. He was also a Fellow of the Royal Society of New Zealand. In the 1967 Queen's Birthday Honours, Liley was appointed a Companion of the Order of St Michael and St George, for valuable services to medicine. In the 1973 Queen's Birthday Honours, he was promoted to Knight Commander of the Order of St Michael and St George, for distinguished service to medicine.

Activism
Liley was one of the founders of the New Zealand anti-abortion group, the Society for the Protection of the Unborn Child (now Voice for Life), in 1971 and served as that organisation's first president. In 1977, Robert Sassone edited a series of interviews with Liley and Jérôme Lejeune, entitled The Tiniest Humans.

Personal life
Liley met his future wife Helen Margaret Irwin Hunt (known as Margaret) as a classmate in medical school; they married in 1953.  They had five biological children and an adopted child with Down syndrome.

The family maintained a  block outside Benneydale in the King Country where Liley exercised a passion for silviculture.

Liley committed suicide in 1983.

Liley Medal

Since 2004 the Health Research Council of New Zealand has annually awarded the Liley Medal in recognition of an outstanding contribution to medical research.

 2004: Richie Poulton, University of Otago
 2005: Richard Faull, University of Auckland
 2006: Lianne Woodward, University of Canterbury
 2007: Innes Asher, University of Auckland
 2008: Ted Baker, University of Auckland and Philippa Howden-Chapman, University of Otago
 2009: Allan Herbison, University of Otago
 2010: Stephen Robertson, University of Otago
 2011: Chris Pemberton, University of Otago
 2012: No award
 2013: Michael Baker, University of Otago
 2014: Ed Gane, Auckland City Hospital
 2015: Ian Reid, prominent in international bone research (also awarded the Rutherford Medal), University of Auckland
 2016: Mike Berridge, Malaghan Institute of Medical Research and Paul Young, Medical Research Institute of New Zealand
 2017: Jonathan Broadbent, University of Otago
 2018: Cynthia Farquhar, University of Auckland
 2019: Ian Reid, Anne Horne and team, University of Auckland
2020: Professor Mark Weatherall, University of Otago, and Mark Holliday, Medical Research Institute of New Zealand
2021: Sarah Jefferies and her team
2022: Valery Feigin, Auckland University of Technology, "for the landmark Lancet Neurology paper that showed for the first time the global, regional, and national burden of stroke and its risk factors in all the world’s 204 countries".
2022: Colin Simpson, Victoria University of Wellington, "for his role as a lead author of one of the first papers in the world to confirm the safety of COVID-19 vaccines."

References

External links
  by Sir John Scott for the RSNZ from Yearbook of the Royal Society of New Zealand: 1997:2:34-41.
 Obitrary from the HRC
 Professor Sir William Liley (1929–83): New Zealand perinatal physiologist  J Med Biogr May 2005 vol. 13 no. 2 82-88
 Kathleen O'Connor, "Albert William Liley (1929–1983)", Embryo Project Encyclopedia (2011) .

1929 births
1983 suicides
New Zealand anti-abortion activists

University of Otago alumni
Fellows of the Royal Society of New Zealand
Members of the Pontifical Academy of Sciences
20th-century New Zealand medical doctors
New Zealand Knights Commander of the Order of St Michael and St George
People from Auckland
Fellows of the Royal College of Obstetricians and Gynaecologists